The 2004 ATP Tour was the global elite men's professional tennis circuit organised by the Association of Tennis Professionals (ATP) for the 2004 tennis season. The ATP Tour is the elite tour for professional tennis organised by the ATP. The ATP Tour includes the four Grand Slam tournaments, the Tennis Masters Cup, the ATP Masters Series, the International Series Gold and the International Series tournaments.

Schedule 

The table below shows the 2004 ATP Tour schedule.

Key

January

February

March

April

May

June

July

August

September

October

November

Statistical information 
Players and titles won (Grand Slam, Masters Cup, and Olympic titles in bold), listed in order of number of titles:
  Roger Federer – Australian Open, Dubai, Indian Wells Masters, Hamburg Masters, Halle, Wimbledon, Gstaad, Canada Masters, US Open, Bangkok and Masters Cup (11)
  Lleyton Hewitt – Sydney, Rotterdam, Washington, D.C., and Long Island (4)
  Andy Roddick – San Jose, Miami Masters, London Queen's Club and Indianapolis (4)
  Guillermo Cañas – Stuttgart, Umag and Shanghai (3)
  Dominik Hrbatý – Adelaide, Auckland and Marseille (3)
  Carlos Moyà – Chennai, Acapulco and Rome Masters (3)
  Marat Safin – Beijing, Madrid Masters and Paris Masters (3)
  Guillermo Coria – Buenos Aires and Monte Carlo Masters (2)
  Nikolay Davydenko – Munich and Moscow (2)
  Tommy Haas – Houston and Los Angeles (2)
  Nicolás Massú – Kitzbühel and Athens Olympics (2)
  Jiří Novák – Tokyo and Basel (2)
  José Acasuso – Bucharest (1)
  Andre Agassi – Cincinnati Masters (1)
  Tomáš Berdych – Palermo (1)
  Juan Ignacio Chela – Estoril (1)
  Antony Dupuis – Milan (1)
  Nicolas Escudé – Doha (1)
  Gastón Gaudio – French Open (1)
  Fernando González – Viña del Mar (1)
  Jérôme Haehnel – Metz (1)
  Joachim Johansson – Memphis (1)
  Thomas Johansson – Stockholm (1)
  Gustavo Kuerten – Costa do Sauipe (1)
  Michaël Llodra – 's-Hertogenbosch (1)
  Feliciano López – Vienna (1)
  Ricardo Mello – Delray Beach (1)
  Rafael Nadal – Sopot (1)
  Tommy Robredo – Barcelona (1)
  Greg Rusedski – Newport (1)
  Robin Söderling – Lyon (1)
  Vincent Spadea – Scottsdale (1)
  Paradorn Srichaphan – Nottingham (1)
  Fernando Verdasco – Valencia (1)
  Santiago Ventura – Casablanca (1)
  Martin Verkerk – Amersfoort (1)
  Filippo Volandri – St. Poelten (1)
  Mikhail Youzhny – St. Petersburg (1)
  Mariano Zabaleta – Båstad (1)

The following players won their first title:
  Tomáš Berdych – Palermo
  Antony Dupuis – Milan
  Jérôme Haehnel – Metz
  Joachim Johansson – Memphis
  Michaël Llodra – 's-Hertogenbosch
  Feliciano López – Vienna
  Ricardo Mello – Delray Beach
  Rafael Nadal – Sopot
  Robin Söderling – Lyon
  Vincent Spadea – Scottsdale
  Santiago Ventura – Casablanca
  Fernando Verdasco – Valencia
  Filippo Volandri – St. Poelten

Titles won by nation:
  Switzerland 11 (Australian Open, Dubai, Indian Wells Masters, Hamburg Masters, Halle, Wimbledon, Gstaad, Canada Masters, US Open, Bangkok and Masters Cup)
  Argentina 9 (Buenos Aires, Estoril, Monte Carlo Masters, French Open, Båstad, Stuttgart, Umag, Bucharest and Shanghai)
  Spain 8 (Chennai, Acapulco, Valencia, Barcelona, Rome Masters, Casablanca, Sopot and Vienna)
  Russia 6 (Munich, Beijing, Moscow, Madrid Masters, St. Petersburg and Paris Masters)
  United States 6 (San Jose, Scottsdale, Miami Masters, London Queen's Club, Indianapolis and Cincinnati Masters)
  Australia 4 (Sydney, Rotterdam, Washington, D.C., and Long Island)
  France 4 (Doha, Milan, 's-Hertogenbosch and Metz)
  Chile 3 (Viña del Mar, Kitzbühel and Athens Olympics)
  Czech Republic 3 (Palermo, Tokyo and Basel)
  Slovakia 3 (Adelaide, Auckland and Marseille)
  Sweden 3 (Memphis, Lyon and Stockholm)
  Brazil 2 (Costa do Sauipe and Delray Beach)
  Germany 2 (Houston and Los Angeles)
  Italy 1 (St. Poelten)
  Netherlands 1 (Amersfoort)
  Thailand 1 (Nottingham)
  United Kingdom 1 (Newport)

Entry rankings

Singles 

Roger Federer was the ATP Race Champion, finishing the 2004 season as the world number 1 with 6,335 total points.

Retirements 
Following is a list of notable players (winners of a main tour title, and/or part of the ATP rankings top 100 (singles) or top 50 (doubles) for at least one week) who announced their retirement from professional tennis, became inactive (after not playing for more than 52 weeks), or were permanently banned from playing, during the 2004 season:

  Renzo Furlan (born 17 May 1970 in Conegliano, Veneto, Italy) He turned professional in 1988 and reached his career-high ranking of world no. 19 in 1996. He reached the quarterfinals of the French Open in 1995 and earned two career ATP titles. He played his last match in Lugano in June against Jérôme Haehnel.
  Marc-Kevin Goellner (born 22 September 1970 in Rio de Janeiro, Brazil) He turned professional in 1991 and reached his career-high singles ranking of world no. 26 in 1994. He earned two career singles titles and four doubles titles, being ranked no. 25 in doubles. His last singles and doubles matches were in Kish Island, Iran in November.
  Goran Ivanišević (born 13 September 1971 in Split, Croatia) He turned professional in 1988 and reached his career-high ranking of world no. 2 in 1994. He won Wimbledon in 2001, was a semifinalist at the US Open, and a quarterfinalist at the Australian and French Opens. He also won two bronze medals in singles and doubles at the 1992 Olympics. He won 22 singles titles and four doubles titles. He played his last career match at Wimbledon against Lleyton Hewitt.
  Magnus Larsson (born 25 March 1970 in Olofström, Blekinge, Sweden) He turned professional in 1989 and reached his highest singles ranking of world no. 10 in 1995. He reached the semifinals of the French Open in 1994 and the quarterfinals of the US Open three times (1993, 1997, and 1998), as well as earning seven career ATP titles. His highest doubles ranking was no. 26 (also in 1995), and he earned six doubles titles. His final career ATP match was in Copenhagen in February 2003 against Radek Štěpánek.
  Todd Martin (born July 8, 1970, in Hinsdale, Illinois) He turned professional in 1990 and reached a career-high ranking of world no. 4. He was a finalist at the 1994 Australian Open and the 1999 US Open, as well as earning eight career titles. He played his last match in the first round of the US Open against Fabrice Santoro.
  Magnus Norman (born 30 May 1976 in Filipstad, Sweden) He turned professional in 1995 and reached a career-high ranking of world no. 2. He was a finalist at the French Open in 2000. He won 12 singles titles, including the 2000 Tennis Masters Series tournament in Rome. He played his last singles match in the quarterfinals in Shanghai in September 2003 against Jiří Novák.
  Marcelo Ríos (born December 26, 1975, in Santiago, Chile) He turned professional in 1994 and reached the no. 1 ranking in the world. He was a finalist at the Australian Open in 1998 and a quarterfinalist at the French and US Opens. He played his last career match in April in San Luis Potosí against Mariano Delfino.

See also 
 2004 in tennis
 2004 WTA Tour

References

External links 
 Official website Association of Tennis Professionals (ATP)

 
ATP Tour
ATP Tour seasons